Ana María Martínez de Nisser (December 6, 1812 – September 18, 1872) was a Colombian heroine and writer. She participated in the Battle of Salamina on 5 May 1841 during the War of the Supremes. She later published a book about the events of 1840–41.

References
  Tisnés, Roberto María (1983). María Martínez de Nisser y la revolución de los Supremos. Bogotá: Biblioteca Banco Popular.
 Ir a ↑ Restrepo, José Manuel (1952). Historia de la Nueva Granada. Bogotá: Editorial Cromos.

External links
Jorge Orlando Melo, "A Mary to take up arms"

1812 births
1872 deaths
Colombian women writers
Colombian military personnel
Women in war in Colombia
19th-century Colombian people
Women in 19th-century warfare
19th-century Colombian women writers